Michael Gunning (born 29 April 1994) is a Jamaican-British competitive swimmer who is best known for participating in the 200 metre butterfly event. He competed in the 200 metre butterfly and the men's 200 metre freestyle event in both the 2017 World Aquatics Championships and 2019 World Aquatics Championships.

Gunning was a participant at the reality bisexual dating show The Bi Life hosted by Courtney Act, coming out as gay on the show in late 2018. He later went on to win the Pride Award at the Attitude Pride Awards 2019 for his efforts to raise LGBTQ+ visibility around the globe in sports. In 2022, Michael was a contributor in BBC One's 'Tom Daley: Illegal to be Me' documentary, and was announced as the Host at the Birmingham 2022 Commonwealth Games for the swimming events.

Personal life 
Gunning was born on 29 April at Farnborough Hospital in Kent, England, the son of Gillian Trinder and Shaun Gunning. He has one brother – Luke Gunning who is three years younger, and also swam competitively.

Gunning is a survivor of the 2017 Manchester Arena bombing.

References

External links
 

1994 births
Living people
Jamaican male swimmers
Place of birth missing (living people)
Gay sportsmen
LGBT swimmers
Jamaican LGBT sportspeople
Swimmers at the 2019 Pan American Games
Male butterfly swimmers
Jamaican male freestyle swimmers
Pan American Games competitors for Jamaica
Competitors at the 2017 Summer Universiade
Competitors at the 2018 Central American and Caribbean Games